The University of Montana Western (UMW) is a public college in Dillon, Montana.  It is affiliated with the University of Montana and part of the Montana University System. It was founded in 1893 as Montana State Normal School and was also the Western Montana College of the University of Montana before becoming part of the Montana University System in 2000. Enrollment of full-time, degree seeking students as of Fall 2018 was 1,221 students.

History

The college was founded as the Montana State Normal School in 1893 to train teachers according to a model used by other states. Education was considered highly important for the state. The first term of the Montana State Normal School began on September 6, 1897, with courses in elementary education for all grades below high school which took two years to complete, a one-year professional course for all teachers with two years of prior experience, an English-Scientific course which gave students a four-year diploma, a four-year Latin course, and a graduate course.

Academics at the college expanded with increased programs and had a four-year curriculum; the addition of other subjects and departments led to its being renamed as Western Montana College. It became part of the Montana University System in 2000 and its name was changed to University of Montana Western.

Athletics
The Montana–Western (UMW) athletic teams are called the Bulldogs. The college is a member of the National Association of Intercollegiate Athletics (NAIA), primarily competing in the Frontier Conference since the 1933–34 academic year.

Montana–Western competes in 12 intercollegiate varsity sports: Men's sports include basketball, cross country, football, rodeo and track & field (indoor and outdoor); while women's sports include basketball, cross country, rodeo, track & field (indoor and outdoor) and volleyball.

Notable alumni
 Brandon Brown (born 1989), basketball player for Hapoel Jerusalem of the Israeli Basketball Premier League

References

External links
 
 Official athletics website

 
Buildings and structures in Beaverhead County, Montana
Education in Beaverhead County, Montana
Educational institutions established in 1893
Universities and colleges accredited by the Northwest Commission on Colleges and Universities
University of Montana System
Frontier Conference
1893 establishments in Montana
University of Montana Western
University of Montana Western